Burgena is a genus of moths of the family Noctuidae.

Species
There are 20 species within the genus Burgena. These are:
 Burgena amoena Rothschild, 1896
 Burgena anisa
 Burgena arruana
 Burgena baia
 Burgena chalybeata Rothschild, 1896
 Burgena constricta
 Burgena diserta
 Burgena dispar
 Burgena educta
 Burgena euxantha
 Burgena leucida
 Burgena luteistriga
 Burgena pectoralis
 Burgena ravida
 Burgena reducta
 Burgena rookensis
 Burgena splendida Butler, 1887
 Burgena transducta
 Burgena tripartita
 Burgena varia Walker, 1854

References

Agaristinae